Jean Bosco Nsengimana (born 4 November 1992 in Shashwara) is a Rwandan cyclist, who rides for Rwandan amateur team . He won the Tour du Rwanda in 2015 and rode at the UCI Road World Championships.

Major results

2013
 6th Overall Tour du Rwanda
 10th Overall Fenkil Northern Red Sea Challenge
2014
 1st Mountains classification Tour de Blida
 2nd Time trial, National Road Championships
 2nd Overall Tour du Rwanda
2015
 1st  Overall Tour du Rwanda
1st Young rider classification
1st Prologue, Stages 3 & 6
 National Road Championships
2nd Time trial
2nd Under-23 time trial
 3rd  Team time trial, African Games
 5th Overall Tour de Blida
 6th Grand Prix d'Oran
2016
 1st Stage 5 Tour du Cameroun
 1st Stage 5 Grand Prix Chantal Biya
 9th Overall Tour du Rwanda
2017
 1st Mountains classification Tour du Cameroun
 3rd  Team time trial, African Road Championships
 National Road Championships
3rd Time trial
3rd Road race
 4th Overall Tour Meles Zenawi
 4th Overall Tour du Rwanda
1st Prologue
2018
 African Road Championships
2nd  Time trial
2nd  Team time trial
 2nd Time trial, National Road Championships
2019
 2nd  Team time trial, African Road Championships
 2nd Time trial, National Road Championships
2021
 African Road Championships
2nd  Team time trial
2nd  Mixed team relay
2022
 3rd  Time trial, African Road Championships
2023
 3rd  Team time trial, African Road Championships

References

External links

1992 births
Living people
Rwandan male cyclists
African Games bronze medalists for Rwanda
African Games medalists in cycling
Competitors at the 2015 African Games